Alatage is a village in Belgaum district in the southern state of Karnataka, India.

History
A conflict occurred in 2016 over land ownership between the local Banjara community and the rest of the village.

References

Villages in Belagavi district